is a former Japanese football player. He played for Japan national team. His son Yuto Suzuki is also footballer.

Club career
Suzuki was born in Osaka Prefecture on December 19, 1959. After graduating from high school, he joined his local club Yanmar Diesel in 1978. However, he could not play in the game much, as he was the team's reserve goalkeeper behind Kazumi Tsubota. The club won the league champions in 1980. He retired in 1982. He played 8 games in the league.

National team career
In August 1979, Suzuki was selected Japan U-20 national team for 1979 World Youth Championship and he played in 3 games. In December 1980, he was selected Japan national team for 1982 World Cup qualification. At this qualification, on December 22, he debuted against Singapore. He played 4 games for Japan in 1980.

Club statistics

National team statistics

References

External links
 
 
 Japan National Football Team Database

1959 births
Living people
Association football people from Osaka Prefecture
Japanese footballers
Japan youth international footballers
Japan international footballers
Japan Soccer League players
Cerezo Osaka players
Association football goalkeepers